Calosoma bastardi is a species of ground beetle in the subfamily of Carabinae. It was described by Alluaud in 1925.

References

bastardi
Beetles described in 1925